Talamanca de Jarama is a municipality of the Community of Madrid, Spain.

Sights include the Romanesque church of San Juan Bautista, the a 17th-century Carthusian monastery and the Ábside de los Milagros (also known as El Morabito), what remains of a mid-13th-century church. The ruins of Talamanca are considered a Bien de Interés Cultural of Spain.

Public transport 

 197: Torrelaguna - Madrid (Plaza de Castilla) (ALSA)

 197 E: Torrelaguna - Valdepiélagos - Talamanca de Jarama

Twinnings
 Talamanca, Costa Rica

References

 
Municipalities in the Community of Madrid